Fruti Kola is a Peruvian cola produced by Industrias & Derivados del Sur in Ayacucho. The cola is sold in PET bottles of 630 ml.

Fruti Kola